Leucaspius delineatus, known as the sunbleak, belica or moderlieschen is a species of freshwater fish in the family Cyprinidae. It is currently the only species included in genus Leucaspius, whereas formerly others were included, which now have been moved to Ladigesocypris or Pseudophoxinus or merged with L. delineatus.

Description
It has an upward-turned mouth and a short lateral line which extends about seven to ten scales from the gill cover. The anal fin is short and consists of eleven to fourteen rays. This is a silvery fish with a particularly intense band of colour running along the flank.

Distribution

The belica is found all over temperate continental Europe and barely extends to Central Asia in the Caucasus region. The southern limits of its range are essentially marked by the Pyrenees and the Alpide belt.

The common name Moderlieschen is of German origin. Although it looks like a proper word that can be approximately translated as "mouldy Lizzy", it is actually a bowdlerized version of an older name which survives in parts of Germany as Mutterloseken. Literally meaning "the little motherless one", this ultimately refers to the fact that the sticky eggs of the moderlieschen can withstand exposure to air for a remarkably long time. Deposited on water plants, they sometimes stick to the feet of ducks and similar birds and are carried by these to ephemeral ponds. Large numbers of young moderlieschens are thus sometimes encountered when such ponds dry up, and with no adult fish being present this gave rise to the belief that they were "motherless".

It has been introduced to Great Britain, and appears to be established in the Avalon Marshes in Somerset and has been implicated in transmitting a new species of parasitic fluke to both European otter and American mink in the area but where it may now be an important prey species for piscivorous birds.

See also
 Abiogenesis

References

 

Monotypic fish genera
Freshwater fish of Europe
Fish of Asia
Leuciscinae
Taxa named by Johann Jakob Heckel
Fish described in 1843
Taxonomy articles created by Polbot